Roozegar-e Gharib (literally "Gharib's Story") is an Iranian TV series about Dr. Mohammad Gharib, the father of Pediatrics in Iran directed by Kianoush Ayari.

Story
Ayyari wrote the script and the film reveals the story of Dr. Gharib's life from his childhood to the death. It also deals with History of Iran during 1905–1975.

Properties
Filming began at the end of 2002 and ended in the fall of 2007.
Time: 36 episodes, each episode 60 minutes approximately.

First role performers
Five actors act in the role of Dr. Gharib from his childhood to the elderness. Parham Karami, Kaveh Ahangar, Shahab Kasraie, Naser Hashemi, and Mehdi Hashemi act in the first role of the Series.

Cast and crews
Mehdi Hashemi: Old Dr. Gharib
Naser Hashemi: Adult Dr. Gharib
Shahab Kasraei: Young Dr. Gharib
Kaveh Ahangar: Dr. Gharib at the age of 12
Parham Karami: Dr. Gharib  at the age of 7
Mehran Rajabi: Dr. Gharib's father
Afarin Obeysi: Dr. Gharib's wife
Hossein Panahi: Lotf-Ali
Reza Kianian: Ayatollah Firoozabadi
Farahnaz Manafi Zaher: Dr. Gharib's Mother
Reza Babak: Mehdi Bazargan
Amir Hossein Seddigh: Seyyed Ahmad Tabib
Saba Kamali: Seyyed Ahmad Tabib's wife
Reza Fayazi: Dr.Fotohi
Afshin Sangchap:Uncle Dr. Gharib
Maryam Soltani: Afrashteh (Mother of Shaden)

References

External links
 

Iranian television series
2000s Iranian television series
2007 Iranian television series debuts
Islamic Republic of Iran Broadcasting original programming